Bang'n on Wax: The Best of the Crips is a compilation album by the Crip rap group, Nationwide Rip Ridaz.  The album was released on February 11, 1997 for Urban Avenue Records And This Album Contains 10 New Bonus Tracks Songs And 23 Old Songs For The 3 Previous Albums: This Album Contains 12 For Nationwide Rip Ridaz, 4 For Bangin' on Wax 2... The Saga Continues & 6 For Bangin' on Wax

Track listing

References 

Nationwide Rip Ridaz albums
1997 compilation albums